James Biddle (February 18, 1783 – October 1, 1848), of the Biddle family, brother of financier Nicholas Biddle and nephew of Capt. Nicholas Biddle, was an American commodore.

Education and early career
Biddle was born in Philadelphia, where he attended the University of Pennsylvania. After graduating, he entered service in the United States Navy as a midshipman in 1800.

Retained in the navy reduction of 1801, Biddle served in the war against the Barbary pirates. The ship he was in, struck rocks off Tripoli, and along with his commodore, William Bainbridge, he was kept imprisoned for 19 months.

He was in command of the sloop  in 1815 when she defeated .

After the war, Biddle performed various duties in the Gulf of Mexico, the South Atlantic, and the Mediterranean. In 1830, Biddle and US consul David Offly negotiated and concluded a treaty with the Sublime Porte. The treaty was later used by U.S. diplomats to claim extraterritorial privileges for U.S. citizens in the Ottoman Empire.

Biddle and the USS Macedonian
In the early nineteenth century, the prevalence of yellow fever in the Caribbean "led to serious health problems" and alarmed the United States Navy as numerous deaths and sickness curtailed naval operations and destroyed morale. A tragic example occurred in May 1822 when the frigate USS Macedonian left Boston and became part of Commodore James Biddle's West Indies Squadron. Secretary of the Navy Smith Thompson had assigned the squadron to guard United States merchant shipping and suppress piracy. During their deployment seventy six of the Macedonian officers and men died. Seventy four of these deaths were attributed to yellow fever. Biddle reported another fifty two of his crew were on sick-list. In his report to the Secretary of the Navy, Biddle and Surgeon's Mate Dr. Charles Chase  state the cause as  "fever". As a consequence of this loss Biddle noted his squadron was forced to return to Norfolk Navy Yard early. The Macedonian crew upon arrival were provided medical care and quarantined at Craney Island. Biddle upset at the loss of his crew wrote Smith Thompson " how deeply my feelings have been afflicted at the disturbing mortality & sickness and …. I hope you will order an investigation into the cause of the sickness on board."   

Biddle told Thompson the Macedonian had been improperly fitted out in Boston and while there, the frigate's hold was never properly cleaned and that the filth and debris he discovered in the hold had led to the fever. Biddle consequently brought charges against Commodore Isaac Hull then in command at the Boston Naval Yard. Medical testimony during a court of inquiry however supported the conclusion that a drastic change in temperatures, dampness and tropical climate were the proximate cause of the fever, and "Much to Biddle's chagrin the court of inquiry found Hull not guilty."

Expeditions to Asia

In December 1845, Biddle exchanged ratifications of the Treaty of Wanghia at Poon Tong (泮塘), a village outside Guangzhou. The treaty was the first treaty between China and the United States.
 
Biddle delivered his request that Japan agree to a similar treaty to that which had just been negotiated with China. A few days later a Japanese junk approached Biddle's flagship, and requested his presence on board their ship to receive the Tokugawa shogunate's official response. Biddle was reluctant at first, but eventually agreed. As Biddle attempted to board the Japanese ship, he misunderstood the instructions of one of the samurai guards and was physically knocked back by the guard who then drew his sword. Biddle retreated to his flagship. The Japanese officials apologized for the mishap. Biddle eventually received the shogunate's response, and was told that Japan forbade all commerce and communication with foreign nations besides that of the Dutch; also, he was informed that all foreign affairs were conducted through Nagasaki, and that his ships should leave Uraga immediately. 

Seven years later, Commodore Matthew Perry did the task with four warships. Perry was well aware of Biddle's reception, and strove to make sure that he would not be treated in the same manner.

Biddle died in Philadelphia, and is buried at Christ Church Burial Ground in the family plot.

See also
 Closed Japan

References

Further reading
 Long, David F. Long. (1983). Sailor-Diplomat: A Biography of Commodore James Biddle, 1783-1848 Boston: Northeastern University Press.  
Sakamaki Shunzo.  Japan and the United States, 1790-1853. Wilmington: Scholarly Resources, 1973.
 Sewall, John S. (1905). The Logbook of the Captain's Clerk: Adventures in the China Seas, Bangor, Maine: Chas H. Glass & Co. [reprint by Chicago: R.R. Donnelly & Sons, 1995]

External links

 Documents relating to Biddle's mission to Oregon
 T. C. Elliott, "An Event of One Hundred Years Ago" in Oregon Historical Quarterly vol. 19 (1918).

1783 births
1848 deaths
United States Navy officers
James
Congressional Gold Medal recipients
Oregon Country
Members of the Philadelphia Club
Military personnel from Philadelphia
University of Pennsylvania alumni
American people of the Barbary Wars
Burials at Christ Church, Philadelphia
People from Pennsylvania in the War of 1812